An Emigrant Aid Society was a charitable organisation that helped immigrants, usually of a particular nationality.  They were particularly active in the United States.

Examples include:

 The New England Emigrant Aid Company
 The Friendly Sons of St. Patrick
 The Hibernian Society for the Relief of Emigrants from Ireland
 Charitable Irish Society of Boston 
 The Irish Emigrant Society of New York

References

Diaspora organizations